Frederick Richard Mallet (10 February 1841 - 24 June 1921) was an Irish geologist who worked for thirty years in the Geological Survey of India.

Life and work 
Mallet was born in Dublin, the son of Robert Mallet, a geologist. After studying at the Enniskillen Royal School in 1858 he joined the Geological Survey of India in February 1859. He worked in the Himalayas, Central India, Assam and Burma while also being in charge of the Museum and Laboratory. He published numerous papers on the geology of the Vindhya range and examined the Barren Island volcano. He became a Superintendent of the Survey in 1883 and retired in 1889. He contributed to Medlicott's Manual of the Geology of India, the fourth part which dealt with mineralogy. Mallet was involved in the survey of coalfields in the Naga Hills, the Son Valley, southern Mirzapur, and Rewa. He accompanied Ferdinand Stoliczka and William Theobald on expeditions to the Sutlej and Spiti valleys. He was the first geologist to scientifically study the Ramgarh crater in 1869.

Apart from geology, he also took an interest in natural history, corresponding with Allan Octavian Hume on birds.

He was elected to Geological Society of London in 1868. He died at Ealing from ailments of the kidneys and prostate.

References

External links 
 Family history

1841 births
1921 deaths
Irish geologists
Fellows of the Geological Society of London